National Route 178 is a national highway of Japan connecting Maizuru, Kyoto and Iwami, Tottori in Japan, with a total length of 201 km (124.9 mi).

References

178
Roads in Hyōgo Prefecture
Roads in Kyoto Prefecture
Roads in Tottori Prefecture